Aloe namibensis is a species of plant in the genus Aloe. It is endemic to Namibia.  Its natural habitat is rocky areas. It is threatened by habitat loss.

References 

namibensis
Endemic flora of Namibia
Least concern plants
Least concern biota of Africa
Taxonomy articles created by Polbot